HMS Atlas was a 98-gun second-rate ship of the line of the Royal Navy, launched on 13 February 1782. She was a  built at Chatham Dockyard by Nicholas Phillips.

History
For some of the period between 1798 and 1802, she was under the command of Captain Theophilus Jones.

In 1802 she was reduced to a 74-gun ship.

In 1798, some of her crew were court-martialed for mutiny.

She participated in the naval Battle of San Domingo on 6 February 1806, when she suffered eight killed and 11 wounded. Her captain was Samuel Pym, who had joined her the year before.

In 1808, while off Cadiz and serving as the flagship of Rear Admiral Purvis, she came under fire from French batteries on many occasions. In all, she lost about 50 men killed and wounded. She was responsible for the destruction of Fort Catalina.

Atlas was fitted as a temporary prison ship at Portsmouth from 1813 to 1814. She then spent some months as a powder magazine. She was finally broken up in 1821.

Citations and notes

References

 Lavery, Brian (2003) The Ship of the Line - Volume 1: The development of the battlefleet 1650-1850. Conway Maritime Press. .
 

Ships built in Chatham
Ships of the line of the Royal Navy
Duke-class ships of the line
1782 ships